NSF (an initialism for National Sanitation Foundation) is a product testing, inspection, certification organization with headquarters in Ann Arbor, Michigan. NSF also offers consulting and training services worldwide.

History
NSF International was founded in 1944 from the University of Michigan's School of Public Health as the National Sanitation Foundation (NSF) to standardize sanitation and food safety requirements. The process established to develop NSF International's first standards regarding the sanitation of soda fountain and luncheonette equipment, became the process by which NSF International developed other public health and safety standards. To date, NSF has developed more than 80 public health and safety American National Standards. As NSF expanded services beyond sanitation and into new international markets, the legal name was changed to NSF International in 1990.

NSF is an accredited, independent third-party certification body that tests and certifies products to verify they meet these public health and safety standards. Products that meet these standards bear the NSF mark.

Its 1,200+ staff (located worldwide – including N & S America / Europe / Africa / Asia / Oceania) includes microbiologists, toxicologists, chemists, engineers, food safety specialists, environmental, food scientists and public health professionals.

Programs

NSF's Food Division is a marketing-leading food safety and assurance service provider that assists businesses in the  agriculture, food processing, food equipment, restaurant and retail industries. Services include product certification, consulting, training and technical services, supply chain food safety and retail and store safety. For example, Global Food Safety Initiative (GFSI) certification (SQF, BRC, GLOBALG.A.P., FSSC, IFS, Aquaculture Certification Council (ACC)); Marine Stewardship Council (MSC); HACCP  validation and inspection; and organic and gluten-free certification through QAI (Quality Assurance International). NSF’s Food division also certified foodservice equipment, consumer products, nonfood compounds, bottled water and packaged ice. Through consulting, training, technical services and retail support services, NSF helps businesses across the food industry by protecting food and people throughout the supply chain.

Our Water Division protects global public health with safer water solutions.  The team certifies products that come into contact with drinking water, such as plumbing components, water treatment chemicals and drinking water filters, as well as pool and spa equipment. Also covered by this team is wastewater testing and certification. NSF develops comprehensive Water Management Plans and Risk Assessments that minimize risks in your facilities or commercial buildings. Our experts identify hazards and recommend water safety measures, so your team can develop a comprehensive water management program that meets your properties' health and safety needs.

NSF's Health Sciences division protects global public health with services for health and wellness, pharmaceutical, medical devices, in vitro diagnostic, and biotech industries. NSF offers a range of health sciences services, including clinical research, product certification, training, and consulting. Amarex  is an NSF company that provides a range of clinical product development services. Health science product certification includes dietary supplement/cosmetic/OTC Good Manufacturing Practices certification, dietary supplement contents testing and certification, and NSF Certified for Sport® dietary supplement certification.

NSF International is the North American leader for certifying Class II biological safety cabinets (BSCs) to NSF/ANSI 49: Biosafety Cabinetry. Required by most hospitals and research laboratories, the standard tests and evaluates the design, construction and performance of BSCs requiring biosafety level 1, 2, 3 or 4 containment. In addition, NSF operates two accreditation programs that evaluate the proficiency of BSC field certifiers. The enhanced program is for those living and working in North America. It represents the premier credential for certifying Class II BSCs intended for North American hospitals and research facilities. The basic program is for field certifiers living and working outside of North America.

The NSF Consumer Products Division tests and certifies consumer products and appliances used in and around the home including home appliances, cookware, bakeware, small kitchen electronics, bottled water and beverages, nutritional and dietary supplements, private label goods and personal care products.

Our sustainability services include certification and claims validation for sustainably produced commercial and consumer products such as personal care products, carpet, flooring, fabrics and other building materials; and circularity, waste and materials management; safer chemistry (e.g., Safer Choice, CleanGredients(r), Green Screen(r), RC14001(r), and RCMS (r)); sustainable practices and systems through ISO 14001, ISO 54001, social responsibility and Global Wind Organisation certification.  Responsible recycling of electronics, Environmental Product Declarations, and forestry services are also in our portfolio.

NSF International Strategic Registrations (NSF-ISR) an NSF company, is a leading global certification body. It offers comprehensive certifications to internationally accepted standards for information security (e.g. ISO 27001, ISO 20000-1), specialty services (automotive and aerospace) and management systems that includes environmental, occupational health and safety standards) For example,  ISO 9001, ISO 14001, AS9100.

Education and Training in the food safety, water, health sciences, consumer product and management systems certification industries is offered to professionals in these service and production industries.

Laboratories
NSF maintains laboratories in North America, South America, Europe and China. NSF's laboratories are accredited by the Occupational Safety and Health Administration. NSF laboratories are ISO 17025 certified (testing and calibration). They provide a wide range of testing and support certification efforts and technical services for the home appliances and consumer product industries (e.g., beverage quality, food service equipment, nutritional supplement, and filtration systems); retail food, growers, processors and seafood industries; pipes, plumbing components and treatment chemicals for the water industry; and analytical testing for the supplement and pharmaceutical industry.

Standards development
Accredited by the American National Standards Institute and the Standards Council of Canada, NSF facilitates the development and continuous improvement of technical standards, protocols and guidance documents. NSF standards are developed, maintained and revised by the committee ballot system, similar to that used by American National Standards Institute (ANSI) and ASTM. To ensure balanced input, the committees consist of stakeholders affected by the scope of the standard such as industry representatives, public health/regulatory officials, users/consumer representatives and other relevant interest groups.  Any updates to standards related to testing requirements are vetted through round-robin testing at multiple labs to help ensure repeatability, and balloting ensures majority rule. The NSF Council of Public Health Consultants provides final ratification of any balloted change to a standard to help ensure the NSF mission of improving and protecting public health is upheld.

References

External links
 NSF International

Organizations based in Ann Arbor, Michigan
Product-testing organizations
Certification marks
Standards organizations in the United States